Long Tall Sally is a clothing and shoe retailer for tall women 5′8″ and over. Founded in London in 1976, the company offered clothing with sizing adjustments for longer torso lengths, rises on pants, and dart positions on blouses. It sold under several labels including Karl Lagerfeld Paris and its own LTS label.

The first store was opened in 1976 on Chiltern Street in the West End of London. By 2012 the company had stores in UK, US, Canada, and Germany. The company also sold via mail order using catalogues . In 2018 the business became a solely online retailer.

In 2008 the company started selling in North America through catalogue and web marketing, and in 2009 acquired the Canadian assets and trade of Tall Girl, including nine stores across Canada and the United States. Since then the company has also taken over German tall business Long Fashion, US retailer Long Elegant Legs and US footwear business Bare Foot Tess. The range features brands such as NYDJ, Silver, Hush Puppies, Clarks, Nine West, Ruby Rocks, Karl Lagerfeld Paris among others.

In June 2020 the company announced its closure. The business planned to wind down trading in August. On August 19th the company announced that it was acquired by AK Retail of Peterborough, UK. The business was to continue under the new owner as of 1st September, 2020.

References

External links
 

British companies established in 1976
Clothing retailers of the United Kingdom
Online retailers of the United Kingdom
Companies based in the London Borough of Tower Hamlets